Reed Bingham State Park is a 1,613 acre (6.53 km²) Georgia state park in Colquitt County and Cook County located 5 miles east of Ellenton. The park surrounds a 375 acre (1.52 km²) lake that is a tourist attraction in southern Georgia.  Inside the park, visitors can hike the 3.5 mile (5.6 km) long Coastal Plains Nature Trail, which goes through a baldcypress swamp, a pitcher plant bog, and sandhill area.  The park also contains many animals, including the threatened gopher tortoise and the indigo snake.  In addition, the park offers camping and fishing with special ponds for kids that are only open on specific dates.

Facilities
46 tent/trailer/RV Sites
 6 picnic shelters
 4 group shelters
 3 boat ramps
3 fishing docks
Pioneer camping
Playground and miniature golf course

Annual events
Easter Egg Hunt (Easter)
Fishing Rodeo (Memorial Day, Labor Day, and 4th of July)

References

External links
Reed Bingham State Park
Reed Bingham State Park Bridge historical marker

State parks of Georgia (U.S. state)
Protected areas of Colquitt County, Georgia
Protected areas of Cook County, Georgia